Sadri Skander (born April 10, 1982) is a Tunisian TV presenter and producer, entrepreneur and editor-in-chief. He is the first Auto TV show since 2011 in Tunisia. He is  editor and chief editor of Tunisie Automobile magazine. He also produced and presented programs Drive and Fast on Tunisna TV, 100% Auto on Nessma, Auto Plus on El Hiwar El Tounsi, AutoPRO on Attessia TV.

Early life and education
Born on April 10, 1982 in Tunis, Tunisia, he lived in Paris until the age of twelve, before returning to Tunis where he studied at the Lycée Gustave Flaubert. Graduated from the Faculty of Economics and Management of Aix-Marseille III University with a CCA specialization control, accounting and audit, he decided to enroll at the Higher Institute of Automotive Trade in Le Mans, from which he  graduated in 2008.

He then joined the Opel marketing department for a year and a half before returning to Tunisia in 2009 and launching AutoPRO, a company for the sale and take-back of used vehicles, with the parallel idea of launching Auto TV programm at the end of 2011.

Career 
In 2015, Sadri Skander launched a bimonthly Tunisia automotive magazine.

In April 2017, Sadri launched AutoPRO, the largest used vehicle sales center in Tunisia.

In October 2018, he signed with a partaneriat with Italcar, representative of Fiat, Alfa Romeo, Jeep and Lancia and with Stafim representative of STAFIM the official importer of   Peugeot, in May 2019.

In January 2020, he became the face of the Bridgestone brand on the Tunisian market during his contract with the commercial rubber tire company S.C.P.

TV career 
Late 2011 early 2012, he began a TV career with Drive and Fast on Tunisina TV until 2013.

In 2013- 2014, he presented the television show 100% Auto on Nessma.

Between 2014 and 2018, he is presenter and co-producer of the auto TV show Auto Plus and at the same time he presented Karhabtek Labess on El Hiwar El Tounsi.

Since 2018, he has co-produced and hosted the AutoPRO TV show on the Attessia TV channel. The TV show deals with automotive news in Tunisia and internationally. Reports test drivers, comparisons and covers of car shows, but also large formats for meetings with personalities related to the automotive world in Tunisia and aboard.

Personal life
Sadri married Chirine.

Selected works

TV programs

References

External links
  
 

1982 births
Living people
Tunisian television presenters
Tunisian television producers